The 1983 NCAA men's volleyball tournament was the 14th annual tournament to determine the national champion of NCAA men's collegiate volleyball. The tournament was played at St. John Arena in Columbus, Ohio during May 1983.

UCLA defeated Pepperdine in the final match, 3–0 (15–10, 16–14, 15–7), to win their tenth national title. The Bruins (27–4) were coached by Al Scates.

UCLA's Ricci Luyties was named the tournament's Most Outstanding Player. Luyties, along with six other players, comprised the All-tournament team.

Qualification
Until the creation of the NCAA Men's Division III Volleyball Championship in 2012, there was only a single national championship for men's volleyball. As such, all NCAA men's volleyball programs (whether from Division I, Division II, or Division III) were eligible. A total of 4 teams were invited to contest this championship.

Tournament bracket 
Site: St. John Arena, Columbus, Ohio

All tournament team 
Ricci Luyties, UCLA (Most outstanding player)
Doug Partie, UCLA
Wally Martin, UCLA
Steve Gulnac, UCLA
Troy Tanner, Pepperdine
Jeff Stork, Pepperdine
Edwin Fernandez, Ohio State

See also 
 NCAA Men's National Collegiate Volleyball Championship
 NCAA Division I Women's Volleyball Championship

References

1983
NCAA Men's Volleyball Championship
NCAA Men's Volleyball Championship
Volleyball in Ohio
1983 in sports in Ohio
May 1983 sports events in the United States